Parnassida was one of the provinces of the Phocis Prefecture, Greece, encompassing the area around Mount Parnassus. It was abolished in 2006.

Its territory corresponded with that of the current municipality of Delphi.

References

Provinces of Greece
Phocis
Mount Parnassus